General Beach may refer to:

Dwight E. Beach (1908–2000), U.S. Army general
Hugh Beach (1923–2019), British Army general
Lansing Hoskins Beach (1860–1945), U.S. Army major general
William Dorrance Beach (1856–1932), U.S. Army brigadier general
William Henry Beach (1871–1952), British Army major general